This is a list of Grade I listed buildings in Wiltshire, England, in the United Kingdom.

These buildings are protected for their historic significance. There is a parallel system for ancient monuments, known as 'scheduling', which means that there is not a consistent approach to sites like castles, abbeys and henges, which may be listed, scheduled or both. In England, the listing is administered by Historic England, an agency of the government's Department for Digital, Culture, Media and Sport.

Buildings of outstanding architectural or historic interest are listed at Grade I, and of the approximately 372,905 listed buildings in England, over 9,000 (2.5%) are Grade I.  Estimates to the numbers of buildings do, however, vary given that separate listings apply to structurally separate buildings: therefore a street of houses can be listed as one building, but a church wall can be listed separately from the church.  Some buildings are listed for their group value.

This list covers the nearly 300 Grade I listed buildings in the ceremonial county of Wiltshire, grouped by former district.  There is a characteristically large contribution from Church of England (Anglican) parish churches, and several great English country houses are included with some of their landscaping features.  Several barns are included, and Crofton Pumping Station is associated with water supply.

Salisbury

There are 38 Grade I listed buildings in the city of Salisbury, many of them associated with Salisbury Cathedral.

Swindon

|}

Trowbridge

|}

Wiltshire

|}

See also
 :Category:Grade I listed buildings in Wiltshire
 List of Grade I listed buildings in Salisbury
 Grade II* listed buildings in Wiltshire

Notes

References and footnotes

External links

 
 
Lists of listed buildings in Wiltshire